Nadodi is a 1966 Indian Tamil-language film, produced and directed by B. R. Panthulu. The film stars M. G. Ramachandran (credited as M. G. R), B. Saroja Devi and Bharathi in her acting debut. It was released on 14 April 1966, and became a modest commercial success.

Plot 
Thyagu remains inconsolable since Meena, his lover, committed suicide because of her father, the wealthy Dharmalingam. The latter categorically refused Meena's marriage to her beloved Thyagu, under the pretext that Thyagu belongs to an oppressed caste, while the same father, an activist speaker travels the country, by crying out, by preaching, to anyone who might be listening the virtues of the abolition of the caste system.

To trap him, confront his hypocrisy and to honour her older sister, Radha, the second daughter of Dharmalingam leaves upon meeting the mysterious benefactor that seems to be Thyagu, and decides to marry him. Indeed, this good model son, adoptive, gave up his immense heritage, preferring to bequeath integration to the blue-collar workers of his late father. Thyagu ends up leaving the family field and is put in search of plenitude, by making of course its passage.

Radha meanwhile, falls into the claws of Jambu, a former gardener, who holds her because of the misfortunes caused by her father, particularly the death of his mother and her little sister. In reprisals, by reminding the contemptible words uttered by Dharmalingam against his blind little sister, Jambu decides to return the similar one. He deprives Radha of her sight and puts her at the street corner to beg. Later, the ways of Radha and Thyagu cross. Alas, neither one, nor the other can be recognised, be identified about it.

Cast 

Male cast
 M. G. R as Thyagu
 M. N. Nambiar as Jambu
 Nagesh as Valippu Manickam
 V. K. Ramasamy as Dharmalingam
 K. R. Ramasamy as Nagendran
 V. Gopalakrishnan as Thyagu (Imposter)
 P. S. Venkatachalam as Arumugam Mudaliar
 S. M. Thirupathisami as Grandfather
 Gundu Mani as Pikshandhi

Female cast
 B. Saroja Devi as Radha
 Bharathi as Meena
 P. K. Saraswathi as Lakshmi
 Baby Shakeela as Rajee
 Jayakumari as Jambu's blind sister

Supporting cast
 Loose Arumugam, Raja, S. A. G. Sami, Kumar, Kamakshinathan, Kesavan, Sami, Dhandapani, P. S. Selvaraj.

Production 
Nadodi was produced and directed by B. R. Panthulu under Padmini Pictures. The dialogues were written by R. K. Shanmugam from a story by G. Balasubramaniam. V. Ramamoorthy handled the cinematography, and R. Devarajan did so for editing. Bharathi made her acting debut in this film.

Soundtrack 
The soundtrack was composed by M. S. Viswanathan. "Ulagamengum" is based on "Tom Dooley" by The Kingston Trio.

Release and reception 
Nadodi was released on 14 April 1966. Ananda Vikatan negatively reviewed the film, calling it worth watching only for the songs. Kalki, however, reviewed the film more positively. The film was a modest success, with a theatrical run of 70 days.

References

External links 

1960s Tamil-language films
1966 films
Films about the caste system in India
Films directed by B. R. Panthulu
Films scored by M. S. Viswanathan